Lake Massaciuccoli (Lago di Massaciuccoli in Italian) is a lake in the Province of Lucca, Tuscany, Italy. Its surface area is 6.9 km². It is located mainly in the municipality of Massarosa and partly in Torre del Lago, a civil parish of Viareggio.

It is one of the largest remaining fragments of the large swamps and marshes that once covered entirely the coastal plain of Versilia. The lake was known in ancient times as the Fossis Papirianis, a name used in the Tabula Peutingeriana. 

The village of Massaciuccoli lies on its shore.

The composer Giacomo Puccini lived in a villa at Torre del Lago on the west side of the lake, and frequently hunted around the lake; the nearby village of Torre del Lago is sometimes mentioned with suffix "Puccini" in his honour.

The lake is home to the large extent of Cladium mariscus in Italy. However, vegetation and wildlife have shrunken substantially since the 20th century, due to eutrophication and expansion of Louisianan Crayfish.

References

Massaciuccoli
Ramsar sites in Italy